Christian Kaufmann may refer to:

Christian Kaufmann (bef. 1830 – bef. 1885), Swiss mountain guide from Grindelwald; first ascendant of the Mönch
Christian Kaufmann (alpine guide) (1872–1939), Swiss mountain guide from Grindelwald active in Canada
Christian Kaufmann (canoeist) (born c. 1940), West German slalom canoeist
Christian Kaufmann (skier) (born 1976), Swiss Olympic skier